The 1977–80 Balkan Cup, was the 12th Balkan Cup football tournament. It was the first to have a group stage involving the five teams split into two groups, one of three teams and the other of two, with the winner of each one meeting in the final. It was played between February 1977 and August 1980 between Turkey, Romania, Bulgaria, Yugoslavia and Greece. The tournament was won by Romania the general score being 4–3 against Yugoslavia in the two legs of the final. The top goalscorer was Anghel Iordănescu from Romania with 6 goals.

Group stage

Group 1 

Romania qualified for the final.

Matches

Group 2 

Yugoslavia qualified for the final.

Matches

Final 

|}

First leg

Second leg

Winner

Statistics

Goalscorers

References 

1977–80
1977–78 in European football
1978–79 in European football
1979–80 in European football
1977–78 in Bulgarian football
1978–79 in Bulgarian football
1979–80 in Bulgarian football
1977–78 in Romanian football
1978–79 in Romanian football
1979–80 in Romanian football
1977–78 in Greek football
1978–79 in Greek football
1979–80 in Greek football
1977–78 in Yugoslav football
1978–79 in Yugoslav football
1979–80 in Yugoslav football
1977–78 in Turkish football
1978–79 in Turkish football
1979–80 in Turkish football